Gráfelli is the second highest mountain of the Faroe Islands  located on the island of Eysturoy. It has an elevation of 856 metres. Slættaratindur just south-east of the mountain is 24 metres higher at 880 metres, the highest point of the Faroes. Funningur lies at the foot of both Slættaratindur and Gráfelli.

References

Mountains of the Faroe Islands